State Route 121 (SR-121) is a state highway that is an alternative to US-40 and US-191. It serves the communities of Vernal, Lapoint, Neola, Cedarview, and Roosevelt. From Vernal to Neola, it is signed as an east–west route. Then, from Neola to State Street in Roosevelt, it is signed as a north–south route. The route is once-more signed east–west from Roosevelt to US-40/US-191.

Route description

Starting in Roosevelt at the intersection with US-40/US-191 (200 East), the route travels west for approximately one half mile, before turning northwest, then turning north through Cedarview to Neola. In Neola, the route makes a right turn onto 9000 North and begins travelling east. It generally follows this easterly direction across the Duchesne County/Uintah County county line, through Lapoint, before entering Vernal. In Vernal, the route makes a right turn, and travels south for less than one mile (1.6 km) before terminating at the intersection with Main Street US-40/US-191 (Main Street).

History
The state legislature added the entire length of SR-121 to the state highway system in 1931 (though it was known as SR-122 until 1933). The route was truncated in 1953 to run only from Roosevelt to the bridge over the Whiterocks and Ouray Valley Canal east of Lapoint. A short piece at the east end was redesignated State Route 245, from Vernal west to the bridge over the Highline Canal west of Maeser, but the more rugged section between the bridges was removed from the state highway system. This split was undone in 1969, when SR-121 again became a continuous route from Roosevelt to Vernal.

Major intersections

References

121
 121
 121